The 2007 Australian Grand Prix (officially the 2007 Formula 1 ING Australian Grand Prix) was a Formula One motor race held on 18 March 2007 at the Melbourne Grand Prix Circuit, Melbourne, Australia. It was the first race of the 2007 FIA Formula One World Championship. The 58 lap race was won by Kimi Räikkönen for the Ferrari team after starting from pole position. Fernando Alonso finished second in a McLaren car, with teammate and future 7 time World Champion Lewis Hamilton third on his Grand Prix debut.

Räikkönen started the race alongside Alonso, but in the start Alonso was passed by BMW Sauber driver Nick Heidfeld and Hamilton, who started third and fourth. Räikkönen controlled the race from the front of the field, with Alonso regaining second place after overtaking Hamilton during the second round of pit stops.

The Grand Prix was also the first Grand Prix since 2000 Malaysian Grand Prix where all Formula One entrants utilized Bridgestone tyres as Michelin quit the sport after the 2006 season.

Report

Friday drivers

Practice 
The morning session of Friday practice, run in wet weather, saw McLaren's Fernando Alonso take the fastest lap of the session, over a second faster than the next fastest time set by Ferrari's Felipe Massa. The rain dried up for the afternoon session which saw the two Ferraris of Massa and Kimi Räikkönen first and second respectively with the fastest non-Ferrari driver, Lewis Hamilton, just under a tenth of a second behind Räikkönen. The rest of the top six were from different teams with fourth place going to Giancarlo Fisichella of Renault. Nick Heidfeld in the BMW Sauber was fifth and Alexander Wurz's Williams completed the top six. "This was a positive start to the weekend" Massa commented, "but of course what counts is tomorrow's qualifying and most of all, Sunday's race."

The morning session of Saturday brought with it sunny skies, but also a light drizzle at the start of the session. This forced teams who went out early to use their wet tires, but what little water was on the track dried up quickly enough to have no effect on any racer on dry tires. Räikkönen was the consistent pace-setter and topped the chart with a 1:26.064. Fisichella pushed his Renault to second with a time of 1:26.454. Rookie Lewis Hamilton came third over his teammate, the double and defending World Champion Fernando Alonso who came in at seventh. The slowest team of 2006, Super Aguri, got into the top ten with fourth and tenth for Anthony Davidson and Takuma Sato, respectively. Felipe Massa and Nick Heidfeld completed the top six.

Qualifying 
Räikkönen followed up his pace-setting morning practice performance by topping the times in Part One of the Qualifying session. Mark Webber set the early benchmark with a 1:27.799, but Lewis Hamilton knocked one and one tenths off that, with a lap of 1:26.674 – his personal fastest lap of the meeting, before Räikkönen took control. Rubens Barrichello and David Coulthard found themselves knocked out of qualifying, along with the Toro Rossos and the Spykers.

Fernando Alonso took command of Part Two with a lap of 1:25.326 to put him at the top of the leaderboard, with teammate Hamilton closely behind in third. BMW's Nick Heidfeld split the McLarens with second. However, Felipe Massa was knocked out of qualifying after an error in turns nine and ten brought his Ferrari to a halt, meaning he started the race from 16th on the grid, which would later become 22nd on the grid due to an engine change. Super Aguri's Takuma Sato made it through to part three. But, along with Massa: Anthony Davidson; both the Williams cars of Rosberg and Wurz; Renault's rookie Heikki Kovalainen and Honda's Jenson Button all went out.

Alonso again set the benchmark in Part Three with a time of 1:27.050. But he was soon knocked off top spot by Räikkönen, who went a second quicker with a lap of 1:26.072. Räikkönen kept pole position, with Alonso second, but Nick Heidfeld was third after Lewis Hamilton had an untidy middle sector which saw him end up in fourth. Robert Kubica was fifth, with Giancarlo Fisichella sixth.

Red Bull's Mark Webber was seventh with the Toyotas of Ralf Schumacher and Trulli eighth and ninth. Super Aguri's Sato rounded out the top ten.

Race 
Race day saw a crowd of 105,000 people attend the opening round of the 2007 season, and the first race of the "post-Schumacher" era. The only changes before the race were that Felipe Massa started last after an engine-change, and Christijan Albers opted to start from the pitlane.

At the start, Räikkönen got clear off the line. Alonso was passed by Heidfeld on the left and was stuck behind Räikkönen to his front. Hamilton was also briefly stuck behind the leading three before taking the outside line coming into the first corner to take third place; Alonso dropped to fourth position. McLaren team principal Ron Dennis would later accuse BMW of "showboating". Anthony Davidson stalled on the grid and after getting underway hit Adrian Sutil, but managed to keep going. By lap three, Räikkönen was starting to pull away from Heidfeld and by lap five the Finn had a two and a half second lead on the German. Meanwhile, debutant Lewis Hamilton was still holding onto third place from teammate Alonso.

Christijan Albers in the Spyker became the first driver to retire in the new season, missing his braking point at the Sports Center corner and hitting the tire barrier. The first to make a pit stop was second place Heidfeld on lap fifteen; four laps later Kimi Räikkönen pitted and came out in fourth behind Hamilton, now leading on his Grand Prix debut; Alonso and Robert Kubica. Alonso was the first of the two McLarens to pit, suggesting that Hamilton was on a heavier fuel load than his Spanish teammate.

The Briton's McLaren pitted a lap later and rejoined behind Räikkönen, who had now reclaimed his lead, but ahead of Heidfeld, who had now dropped to fifth position, and Alonso, despite being held up by the lone Spyker of Adrian Sutil, who received a drive through penalty for the infringement. Honda's Jenson Button also received a drive through penalty for speeding in the pit lane. Toro Rosso's Scott Speed became the race's second retirement after two of his tires deflated and he crashed at the Clark chicane on lap 31.

Six laps later at the same chicane saw Nico Rosberg overtake Ralf Schumacher for seventh place and soon pulled away from the Toyota. On the same lap, Kubica became the third retirement of the race after problems with his gearbox, which was the part of the car the Polish driver had been most worried about during the pre-season. At the front, meanwhile, Räikkönen was increasing his lead over Hamilton, his lead now over 18 seconds.

Heikki Kovalainen was having, in comparison with Hamilton, a disappointing first race: spinning at the Jones chicane on his 40th lap, which led to him losing a place to Felipe Massa, and running wide on several occasions during the early part of the race. Renault team chief Flavio Briatore described the Finn's debut as "rubbish". Teammate Giancarlo Fisichella was having an uneventful race, as he was not involved in any racing incidents.

Back at the front, Räikkönen made his final scheduled pit stop of the race and rejoined in third, behind the two McLarens of Hamilton, now leading the race for the second time, and Alonso. Unlike the first set of stops, it was Hamilton who would be the first of the two McLarens to pit, allowing Alonso to lead the race for the first time. Alonso pitted a lap later and this time rejoined ahead of his rookie teammate, while Räikkönen took his lead back.

On lap 48, David Coulthard's attempt to pass Alexander Wurz ended with Coulthard's car vaulting over the Williams, narrowly missing the Austrian driver's head. Both drivers escaped unharmed.

Despite a small water leak towards the end, it was Räikkönen who won the race, 7.2 seconds from Alonso and over eighteen seconds from Hamilton, who became the first driver to finish on the podium on their debut since Jacques Villeneuve at the 1996 Australian Grand Prix; it was also the first time a driver had won on their first race for Ferrari since Nigel Mansell in 1989 and also the first race in World Championship history where all three podium finishers were making their debut for their team, disregarding 1950 where all drivers made their World Championship debuts.

Post race there was some criticism of Bridgestone because the rules mandated that the softer tire compound should be "visibly distinguishable" while the car is on track. The tiny white dot on the outer side of the tires proved inadequate. For the next race at Sepang they would go on to paint the "second from outside" groove with white paint.

Classification

Qualifying 

Notes:
 – Felipe Massa was given a ten-place grid penalty for an engine change.

Race

Championship standings after the race 

Drivers' Championship standings

Constructors' Championship standings

Note: Only the top five positions are included for both sets of standings.

References

Session results taken from:

External links

 Australian Grand Prix results (fia.com)
 Results from The Official Formula 1 Website
 Australian Grand Prix 2007 race review

Australian Grand Prix
Australian Grand Prix
Grand Prix
Australian Grand Prix